Kępie may refer to the following places:
Kępie, Lesser Poland Voivodeship (south Poland)
Kępie, Sandomierz County in Świętokrzyskie Voivodeship (south-central Poland)
Kępie, Staszów County in Świętokrzyskie Voivodeship (south-central Poland)